Bundaleer North is a rural locality in the Mid North region of South Australia, situated in the Northern Areas Council. Its modern boundaries were established in April 2001 for the long established local name. Bundaleer North is divided by the RM Williams Way between the Bundaleer Forest Reserve to the west and agricultural land to the east.

The Bundaleer Forest Reserve, established in 1875, was the first plantation for timber production in Australia and the first state forest in South Australia. It was used to sell hardwood logs commercially in its early decades, but expanded into sawn timber after the construction of a sawmill by the Verran government in 1910. It is known as the "birthplace of Australian forestry", and today covers an area of 3,200 hectares. It is open to the public, with camping available from April to November, but is still used for forestry operations. The reserve includes the Bundaleer Picnic Ground and the Bundaleer Arboretum. Three sites associated with the reserve, the Conservator's Hut, the former Forest Office and the 1876 Nursery Site, are jointly listed on the South Australian Heritage Register. The Conservator's Hut has been restored and is now used for accommodation purposes.

Much of the agricultural land to the east of RM Williams Way was among the areas purchased by the state government and divided up for closer settlement programs in the early twentieth century. The North Bundaleer Estate was allotted in 1912, following its purchase the previous year. A subsequent area, known as Moore's Farm, was purchased and allotted to existing North Bundaleer Estate residents in 1918 due to concerns about the viability of the size of the 1912 blocks. The North Bundaleer Homestead, from the original station predating the closer settlement subdivision, survives today and is also listed on the South Australian Heritage Register. It was restored from 1999 to 2002, and is now used as luxury tourist accommodation.

See also 
Hundred of Bundaleer

References 

Towns in South Australia
Mid North (South Australia)